Pery may refer to:

People

Associated with the Earldom of Limerick

 William Pery, 1st Baron Glentworth (1721–1794), Anglican Bishop of Limerick, Ardfert and Aghadoe
 Edmund Pery, 1st Earl of Limerick, politician, fervent unionist
 William Pery, 3rd Earl of Limerick (1840–1896), Irish peer
 William Pery, 4th Earl of Limerick (1863–1929), Irish peer, British army soldier
 Edmond Pery, 5th Earl of Limerick (1888–1967), British peer and soldier
 Patrick Pery, 6th Earl of Limerick (1930–2003), Irish peer and public servant
 Edmund Pery, 7th Earl of Limerick (born 1963)

Other people
 Nicole Péry (born 1943), French socialist politician
 Pery Burge (1955–2013), English artist
 Pery Igel (1921–1998), Brazilian businessman
 Pery Ribeiro (1937-2012), Brazilian singer, songwriter

Other
 Péry, a former municipality in the Bernese Jura of Switzerland
 An abbreviation or reporting mark for Pacific Electric railway.

See also

 Pari (disambiguation)
 Peary (disambiguation)
 John Perie
 Perrie
 Perry (disambiguation)